Conamara Theas, which is Irish for South Connemara, is however today the western Irish-speaking regions County Galway. There are around 7,000 people living in the area (excluding the Aran islands). Between 60% and 80% of residents are native Irish speakers.

It is the part of the Gaeltacht that is west of Cois Fharraige. It is a predominantly Irish-speaking area.  The Conamara Theas variety of Connacht Irish is different from that of Cois Fharraige.

Conamara Theas covers the area from Ros a Mhil, Casla, An Cheathrú Rua, Ceantar na nOileán, Camus, Rosmuc and The Iorras Aithneach peninsula.

The ferryport for the Aran Islands is in Ros a Mhil.

Casla is the location of the national Irish language station RTÉ Raidio na Gaeltachta.

An Cheathrú Rua is the biggest village in the area and the location of the Irish language newspaper Foinse. There is also the Department of Spoken Irish at the National University of Ireland, Galway which has a centre in the village offering third-level courses to both students and overseas learners.

The NUIG also has a second educational centre in Carna.

See also
County Galway
Galway City Gaeltacht
Gaeltacht Cois Fharraige
Aran Islands
Joyce Country
County Donegal
Gaoth Dobhair
Na Rosa
Cloch Cheann Fhaola
Gaeltacht an Láir
County Kerry
Gaeltacht Corca Dhuibhne
County Mayo
Gaeltacht Iorrais agus Acaill

References

 

Geography of County Galway
Irish dialects